Phytorophaga is a genus of flies in the family Tachinidae.

Species
Phytorophaga nigriventris Mesnil, 1942
Phytorophaga petiolata (Townsend, 1926)
Phytorophaga ventralis Bezzi, 1923

References

Diptera of Asia
Exoristinae
Tachinidae genera
Taxa named by Mario Bezzi